Hwanggumpyong, formerly called Hwanggumpyong Island, is a North Korean free-trade area bordering China. The area used to be a tidal island in the Yalu River. However, due to continuous deposition of river-borne sediments, the northern portion of the former island is now permanently connected with the Chinese city of Dandong. A steel mesh fence has been built to mark the land border between North Korea and China.

Due to ethnic Koreans living on the island at the time of a 1962 border treaty, both China and North Korea agreed that the sovereignty of the island belongs to North Korea. The former river island is now a North Korean exclave on the otherwise Chinese side of the river.

History
In June 2011, an agreement, negotiated by Gao Jingde, of Sunbase International Holdings Ltd, with China was made to establish a joint free-trade area on Hwanggumpyong and Wihwa Islands, as well as the Chinese border area near Dandong. By 2013, the site had been prepared, and a free-trade area of over  may be ready for operation in about two years.

As of 2019, the free-trade area has not been very successful.

References

River islands of North Korea